Art Dielhenn is an American television director. 

Primarily working in sitcoms, some of his directing credits include The Cosby Show, A Different World, Punky Brewster, Free Spirit, Sister, Sister, Silver Spoons, Designing Women, Brotherly Love, Head of the Class and The Jamie Foxx Show. He began his career as an associate director on such shows as The Jeffersons and Diff'rent Strokes.

An alumnus of University of Wisconsin, after 1999, Dielhenn retired from the entertainment industry and has since been working as a career coach.

References

External links
 
 

1946 births
Living people
American television directors
University of Wisconsin alumni
Place of birth missing (living people)